|}

The Premier Stayers' Hurdle was a Grade 2 National Hunt hurdle race in England which was open to horses aged five years or older. 
It was run at Haydock Park over a distance of 2 miles and 7½f furlongs (4,727 metres), and it was scheduled to take place each year in January.

The race was first run in 1970 and run for the last time in 2004. It was replaced on the card (Peter Marsh Chase and Champion Hurdle Trial day) by a handicap hurdle race over the same distance.

The race was awarded Grade 2 status in 1992.

Winners

References
Racing Post
 

Haydock Park Racecourse
National Hunt races in Great Britain
National Hunt hurdle races
Discontinued horse races
Recurring events disestablished in 2004